List of current and past men's and women's tennis tournaments.

Criteria for inclusion:
The tournament is notable enough to have its own article on Wikipedia
Historic tournaments are included if notability can be established by reliable third party sources (references needed)

ITF

Grand Slam tournaments

Team events
Davis Cup (men)
Billie Jean King Cup (women)
Hopman Cup (men/women)
Laver Cup (men)
United Cup (men/women)

Junior ITF grade A events
Abierto Juvenil Mexicano
Copa Gerdau (Porto Alegre Junior Championships)
Trofeo Bonfiglio (International Junior Championships of Italy)
Osaka Mayor's Cup
Orange Bowl
Les Petits As (France)

ATP Tour

List of the Association of Tennis Professionals (ATP) Men's tour events.

WTA Tour
List of the Women's Tennis Association (WTA) tour events, initially sorted by type, then by date.

ATP Challenger Tour tournaments
List of ATP Challenger Tour events.

Bold events are still active events. This list features the most recent winners of each tournament, as of 2021 season (included).

Exhibition tournaments

Past events

Men

Women

References